Katty Santaella (born 21 May 1967) is a Venezuelan judoka. She competed in the women's half-lightweight event at the 1996 Summer Olympics.

References

External links
 
 
 
 

1967 births
Living people
Venezuelan female judoka
Olympic judoka of Venezuela
Judoka at the 1996 Summer Olympics
Place of birth missing (living people)